Channel 34 refers to several television stations:

Canada
The following television stations broadcast on digital or analog channel 34 (UHF frequencies covering 591.25-595.75 MHz) in Canada:
 CFGS-DT in Gatineau, Quebec
 CFKM-DT in Trois-Rivières, Quebec
 CFTV-DT in Leamington, Ontario
 CIHF-TV-8 in New Glasgow, Nova Scotia

The following television stations operate on virtual channel 34 in Canada:
 CFGS-DT in Gatineau, Quebec
 CFTV-DT in Leamington, Ontario

Mexico
One regional television network uses virtual channel 34 in Mexico:

Televisión Mexiquense in the State of Mexico and Mexico City area

Vietnam
One regional television network uses virtual channel 34 in Vietnam:
LA34 in Long An province.

See also
 Channel 34 TV stations in Mexico
 Channel 34 digital TV stations in the United States
 Channel 34 virtual TV stations in the United States
 Channel 34 low-power TV stations in the United States

34